Estrus EP is the first EP by John Frusciante, a 7" extended play released in 1997. Only 400–500 copies of this vinyl EP were pressed and could be purchased through Birdman Recordings. The first song, "Estrus", was released as the last song on Smile from the Streets You Hold under the title "Estress". The b-side "Outside Space" was originally recorded for Frusciante's debut album Niandra Lades and Usually Just a T-Shirt, and a brief sample can be heard in the final ten seconds of the track "Mascara".

Track listing

References 

John Frusciante EPs
1997 EPs
Birdman Records albums